Osmanabad Lok Sabha constituency is one of the 48 Lok Sabha (parliamentary) constituencies in Maharashtra state in western India and was earlier named after 7th Nizam of Hyderabad: Osman Ali Khan.

Assembly segments
Presently, Osmanabad Lok Sabha constituency comprises six Vidhan Sabha (legislative assembly) segments. These segments are:

Members of Parliament

Election results

General elections 2019

General elections 2014

General elections 2009

General elections 1980

See also
 Osmanabad district
 Latur district
 Solapur district
 List of Constituencies of the Lok Sabha

References

External links
Osmanabad lok sabha  constituency election 2019 results details
 https://www.thehindu.com/news/national/other-states/maharashtra-cabinet-approves-renaming-of-aurangabad-as-sambhajinagar-osmanabad-as-dharashiv/article65582409.ece

Lok Sabha constituencies in Maharashtra
Latur district
Solapur district